Luigi Bellotti (17 March 1914 – 23 September 1995) was an Italian prelate of the Catholic Church who spent his career in the diplomatic service of the Holy See. He was made an archbishop in 1964 and led diplomatic missions first in Africa and later in Uruguay and then in several Scandinavian countries.

Biography
Luigi Bellotti was born in Verona on 17 March 1914. He was ordained a priest on 11 July 1937.

To prepare for a diplomatic career he entered the Pontifical Ecclesiastical Academy in 1942. He then entered the diplomatic service of the Holy See. His study of the excommunication of Communists and fascists was published in 1949. His early assignments included a stint in the late 1950s as councilor in the Apostolic Internunciature to Turkey.

On 18 July 1964 Pope Paul VI named him titular archbishop of Voncariana and Apostolic Delegate to Central Western Africa. He received his episcopal consecration on 4 October 1964 from Giuseppe Carraro, bishop of Verona. In that post he convinced Francis Arinze, later a cardinal, that he had been chosen to be an auxiliary bishop. He participated as a council father in the third and fourth sessions of the Second Vatican Council.

On 27 November 1969 he was named Apostolic Pro-Nuncio to Uganda. During his time there, in October 1973, Ugandan President Idi Amin accused him of being a spy for the United States Central Intelligence Agency, that he was traveling throughout the country without authorization and spreading rumors to discredit the government.

He was named Apostolic Nuncio to Uruguay on 3 September 1975.

On 27 October 1981, Pope John Paul II appointed Bellotti Pro-Nuncio to Iceland and to Finland, as well as Apostolic Delegate to Scandinavia. On 2 October 1982, in anticipation of the establishment of diplomatic relations between the Holy See and the three nations involved, his appointment as delegate ended and he became Pro-Nuncio to Denmark, to Norway, and to Sweden.

He was replaced in these diplomatic posts on 31 October 1985 by Archbishop Henri Lemaître and died on 23 September 1995.

His personal papers are held by the historical archives of the Church of Verona.

A street in Verona is named for him: Via Mons. Luigi Bellotti.

See also
Apostolic Nunciature to the Nordic Countries

Notes

References

External links
 Catholic Hierarchy: Archbishop Luigi Bellotti 
 Images of Bellotti, St. Ansgar's Bulletin, December 1984, pp. 2, 12

1917 births
1995 deaths
Pontifical Ecclesiastical Academy alumni
Apostolic Nuncios to Uganda
Apostolic Nuncios to Uruguay
Apostolic Nuncios to Finland
Apostolic Nuncios to Iceland
Apostolic Nuncios to Denmark
Apostolic Nuncios to Norway
Apostolic Nuncios to Sweden